The 1968 United States presidential election in Virginia took place on November 5, 1968. All 50 states and the District of Columbia were part of the 1968 United States presidential election. Virginia voters chose 12 electors to the Electoral College, which selected the president and vice president of the United States.

Virginia was won by former Vice President Richard Nixon of California with 43.41% of the vote, who was running against incumbent Vice President Hubert Humphrey of Minnesota and former Alabama Governor George Wallace. Nixon also won the national election with 43.42% of the vote.  Regardless, all candidates had strong regional support in the state; Nixon's votes came mostly from Northern Virginia and the Appalachian Mountain areas, while Humphrey's votes were mainly from the Tidewater region and coal counties in Southwest Virginia. Wallace received the most votes in the Southern Virginia counties.

, this is the last occasion when Powhatan County have voted for a Democratic presidential candidate. It is also the last occasion when Lunenburg County, Mecklenburg County and Pittsylvania County have not voted for the Republican nominee. Essex County would not vote Democratic again until 1996, and James City County would not vote Democratic again until 2020.

Nixon’s victory was the first of ten consecutive Republican victories in the state, as Virginia would not vote for a Democratic candidate again until Barack Obama in 2008. Since then, it has become a safe Democratic state.

Results

Results by county

Notes

References

Virginia
1968
1968 Virginia elections